Tony Aboyantz (21 January 1928 in Krasnodar, Soviet Union – 10 November 1992 in Paris, France) was a Soviet Armenian-born French film director and  assistant director.

Filmography

Director 
 1982 : Le gendarme et les gendarmettes (Jean Girault died during filming which was completed by Tony Aboyantz)

Assistant director / first assistant director  
 1950 : La ronde with Max Ophüls
 1951 : Le Plaisir with Max Ophüls
 1952 :  with Ralph Baum
 1953 : Before the Deluge with André Cayatte
 1955 : Lola Montès with Max Ophüls (Tony Aboyantz is also assistant producer)
 1955 : Marianne of My Youth with Julien Duvivier
 1958 :  with Pierre Chenal
 1959 :  with Pierre Chenal
 1960 : Les Scélérats with Robert Hossein
 1961 : The Game of Truth with Robert Hossein
 1961 :  with Robert Hossein
 1961 : La Belle Américaine with Robert Dhéry and Pierre Tchernia
 1962 : The Devil and the Ten Commandments with Julien Duvivier
 1963 : Angélique, Marquise des Anges with Bernard Borderie
 1964 :  with Jacques Poitrenaud
 1965 : Marvelous Angelique with Bernard Borderie
 1965 : Gendarme in New York with Jean Girault
 1966 : Angelique and the King with Bernard Borderie
 1967 : Les grandes vacances with Jean Girault
 1967 : I Killed Rasputin with Robert Hossein
 1968 : Le gendarme se marie with Jean Girault
 1969 : Le gendarme en balade with Jean Girault
 1970 : , with Michel Audiard
 1971 : Jo with Jean Girault
 1971 :  with Michel Audiard
 1972 :  with Jean Girault
 1973 :  with Jean Girault
 1973 :  with Jean Girault
 1973 : Le Magnifique with Philippe de Broca
 1974 :  with Jean Girault
 1976 : L'Année sainte with Jean Girault
 1977 : Madame Rosa with Moshé Mizrahi
 1978 : The Witness with Jean-Pierre Mocky
 1979 : La Gueule de l'autre with Pierre Tchernia
 1979 :  / Je t'écrirai une lettre d'amour with Moshé Mizrahi
 1982 : Le choc with Robin Davis
 1985 : Le téléphone sonne toujours deux fois!! with 
 1988 :  with Moshé Mizrahi

External links
 

1928 births
1992 deaths
French film directors
Soviet film directors
People from Krasnodar
Soviet emigrants to France